Loipersdorf may refer to:

 Bad Loipersdorf in Hartberg-Fürstenfeld, Styria, Austria.
 Loipersdorf-Kitzladen in Oberwart, Burgenland, Austria.

 A thirteenth-century German language name for Štvrtok na Ostrove in Hungary.